Pleurotomella compacta is a species of sea snail, a marine gastropod mollusk in the family Raphitomidae.

Description
The length of the shell attains 6.5 mm, its diameter 3 mm.

(Original description) The small shell is rather solid and has an ovate-conic shape. Its Colour is uniform buff. The shell contains six whorls, of which two compose the protoconch.

Sculpture : The protoconch is gradate, and coarsely, spirally, engraved. The subsequent whorls are rounded and excavate at the fasciole. The radial ribs are prominent, rounded, extending from the fasciole to the base, set their own breadth apart, about twelve to a whorl. The spirals are delicate threads overriding the radials. On the body whorl they amount to twenty-four, of which three or four on the periphery are larger than the rest. The fasciole is sharply sculptured by crescentic lamellae. The aperture is imperfect in the holotype. The sinus is sutural and of moderate depth.

Distribution
This marine species is endemic to Australia and occurs off New South Wales.

References

 Laseron, C. 1954. Revision of the New South Wales Turridae (Mollusca). Australian Zoological Handbook. Sydney : Royal Zoological Society of New South Wales pp. 56, pls 1–12. 
 Powell, A.W.B. 1966. The molluscan families Speightiidae and Turridae, an evaluation of the valid taxa, both Recent and fossil, with list of characteristic species. Bulletin of the Auckland Institute and Museum. Auckland, New Zealand 5: 1–184, pls 1–23 
 Beu, A.G. 2011 Marine Molluscs of oxygen isotope stages of the last 2 million years in New Zealand. Part 4. Gastropoda (Ptenoglossa, Neogastropoda, Heterobranchia). Journal of the Royal Society of New Zealand 41, 1–153

External links
 

compacta
Gastropods described in 1922
Gastropods of Australia